The list of ship launches in 1684 includes a chronological list of some ships launched in 1684.


References

1684
Ship launches